Gredaro Point (‘Nos Gredaro’ \'nos gre-'da-ro\) is the round and low, mostly ice-covered point on the southeast coast of Trinity Peninsula in Graham Land, Antarctica projecting into Prince Gustav Channel in Weddell Sea, and situated at the east extremity of Zavera Snowfield. The point is named after Gredaro Peak in Pirin Mountain, Bulgaria.

Location
British mapping in 1974.

Maps
 British Antarctic Territory: Graham Land. Scale 1:250000 topographic map. BAS 250 Series, Sheet SQ 19-20. London, 1974.
 Antarctic Digital Database (ADD). Scale 1:250000 topographic map of Antarctica. Scientific Committee on Antarctic Research (SCAR), 1993–2016.

References
 Bulgarian Antarctic Gazetteer. Antarctic Place-names Commission. (details in Bulgarian, basic data in English)
Gredaro Point. SCAR Composite Antarctic Gazetteer.

External links
 Gredaro Point. Copernix satellite image

Headlands of Trinity Peninsula
Bulgaria and the Antarctic